Phlogothauma is a genus of moths in the family Sesiidae.

Species
The genus includes the following species:

 Phlogothauma scintillans Butler, 1882

References

Sesiidae